Malcolm Laurie FRSE FLS (27 February 1866 – 16 July 1932) was a Scottish zoologist and palaeontologist.

Biography

He was born in Brunstane House south of Portobello, Edinburgh on 27 February 1866, the son of Simon Somerville Laurie and his wife, Catherine Ann Hibburd. He was educated at Edinburgh Academy 1876 to 1880. He studied Science, first at Edinburgh University then at Cambridge University where he graduated BA in 1889. He returned to Edinburgh for postgraduate studies and gained his doctorate (DSc) in 1894.

On gaining his doctorate he received an immediate post as Professor of Zoology at St Mungo's College, Glasgow. In 1918 he returned to Edinburgh to lecture in Zoology at both the Royal College of Physicians of Edinburgh and the Royal College of Surgeons of Edinburgh.

In 1894 he had been elected a Fellow of the Royal Society of Edinburgh. His proposers were James Cossar Ewart, James Geikie, Sir William Turner and Ramsay Heatley Traquair. He was also a Fellow of the Linnean Society.

He became examiner in zoology at the University of Glasgow in 1899.

In 1907 he was living at "The Bloom", a villa on Canaan Lane in south-west Edinburgh.

Family

His father was the educator Simon Somerville Laurie. He was the younger brother of chemist Arthur Pillans Laurie (1861-1949), both of whom were also Fellows of the Royal Society of Edinburgh.

Reception

In a letter to Nature, three scientists wrote "The systematic position of Limulus has long been a vexed question, which no one can attempt to solve without consulting the work of Malcolm Laurie on the fossil Eurypterids."

Works
Laurie published numerous papers on the arachnids, especially the scorpions. For instance:
  (reprint)

He also published:

References

External links
 Prof. Malcolm Laurie (summary of sources)

1866 births
1932 deaths
Scottish zoologists
Scientists from Edinburgh
Fellows of the Royal Society of Edinburgh
19th-century British zoologists
19th-century Scottish scientists
Alumni of King's College, Cambridge
Fellows of the Linnean Society of London
Academics of the University of Glasgow
20th-century British zoologists